Qazi Kand (also Romanized as Qāẕī Kand; also known as Kazi-Kandi and Qāẕīkandī) is a village in Qaflankuh-e Sharqi Rural District, Kaghazkonan District, Meyaneh County, East Azerbaijan Province, Iran. At the 2006 census, its population was 138, in 28 families.

References 

Populated places in Meyaneh County